I Want to Fill Myself With You (Quiero llenarme de ti) is a 1969 Argentine film.

Cast
  Sandro as Sandro / Roberto
  Marcela López Rey as Susana
  Walter Vidarte as Raúl
  Soledad Silveyra  as Ana María 
  Fidel Pintos as  Fidel
  Blanca del Prado as Doña Julia
  Linda Peretz as Amiga de Sandro
  Rolo Puente as Juan Manuel
  Tita Gutiérrez
  Pedro Buchardo as Don Pedro
  Trissi Bauer as "Venenito"

External links
 

1969 films
Argentine musical drama films
1960s Spanish-language films
1960s Argentine films
Films directed by Emilio Vieyra